The 2014 World RX of Canada was the 7th round of the inaugural season of the FIA World Rallycross Championship. The event was held at the Circuit Trois-Rivieres in Trois-Rivieres, Quebec.

Heats

Semi-finals

Semi-final 1

Semi-final 2

† Joni Wiman qualified for the semi-finals, but was unable to take the grid. Reinis Nitišs was allowed to take his place.

Final

Championship standings after the event

References

External links

|- style="text-align:center"
|width="35%"|Previous race:2014 World RX of Belgium
|width="30%"|FIA World Rallycross Championship2014 season
|width="35%"|Next race:2014 World RX of France
|- style="text-align:center"
|width="35%"|Previous race:None
|width="30%"|World RX of Canada
|width="35%"|Next race:2015 World RX of Canada
|- style="text-align:center"

Canada
World RX
World RX of Canada